Sister Carol Keehan, D.C. is a member of the Daughters of Charity of Saint Vincent de Paul. She served as president and CEO of the Catholic Health Association of the United States (CHA) from 2005 to 2019.

Biography
From 2005 to 2019, Keenan served as the ninth president and CEO of CHA, overseeing all activities of the organization. There are 620 hospitals affiliated with CHA.

She was awarded the Pro Ecclesia et Pontifice (Cross for the Church and Pontiff) by Pope Benedict XVI. For her dedication to "carrying on the healing ministry of Jesus Christ" she was named one of Time magazine's 100 Most Influential People in the World for 2010.

She is a member of the board of trustees at St. John's University in New York.

References

20th-century American Roman Catholic nuns
Catholic health care
Year of birth missing (living people)
Living people
Place of birth missing (living people)
Mount St. Mary's University alumni
University of South Carolina alumni
21st-century American Roman Catholic nuns
Members of the National Academy of Medicine
21st-century American Roman Catholic religious sisters
20th-century Roman Catholic sisters
21st-century Roman Catholic sisters
American Roman Catholic sisters